The Atlantic Mediterranean Activities Conference (AMAC) is an international scholastic sports organization, made up of international schools along the Mediterranean Sea, as well as Portugal.

Schools
Non-exhaustive list of member schools:
Carlucci American International School of Lisbon  
American School of Barcelona 
American School of Valencia 
American Cooperative School of Tunis  

International sports organizations